Bizik Family Zoo (Zoološki vrt obitelji Bizik) is a private zoo in Našice, Croatia, situated in Markovac Našički. It attracts 20,000 visitors per year.

The founder, Marko Bizik, introduced the first animals (birds) in 1954, and it became a zoo in 1982 when wolves and a family collection arrived. The zoo now also includes big cats.

References

External links 
 About Našice Zoo 

Zoos in Croatia
Buildings and structures in Osijek-Baranja County
Tourist attractions in Osijek-Baranja County